Helminthochiton is an extinct  of polyplacophoran mollusc. Helminthochiton became extinct during the Permian period.

Helminthochiton grayiae was recognised as the type species for Septemchiton. This was named for Elizabeth Gray who collected fossils at Girvan.

Helminthochiton thraivensis has been reassigned to the genus Phthipodochiton in 2012.

References 

Prehistoric chiton genera
Ordovician first appearances
Permian genus extinctions